Te Whareumu (died 1828) was the ariki and warrior chief of Ngāti Manu, a hapū within the Ngāpuhi iwi based in the Bay of Islands in New Zealand.

Te Whareumu was the most important chief in the Kororakeka area in his day. He was a warrior chief of the highest mana in pre-European times and well respected by the early missionaries and traders, to whom he provided the greatest protection.  Te Whareumu quickly realised the advantage of trading with the many ships visiting the Bay.

Family
Born in the late 18th century, possibly about 1770-80, into a high ranking family, Te Whareumu was the son of Te Arahi and Te Ruru. He was closely related to Te Ruki Kawiti and Pōmare I (also called Whetoi) and related to most of the northern chiefs. Te Whareumu assumed control of the tribe after the passing of Tara. Also known as Uruti and 'King George'.

One of Te Whareumu's wives was Moehuri, daughter of Mohi Tawhai, an important chief of the Mahurehure tribe. Another wife was Whakakati, mother of Hori Kingi Tahua and at least three more children. He also married the wife of Tara, who was called Mrs Go-Shore, a term brought about from her boarding the ships in the harbour and telling them to come ashore.

References 

1828 deaths
Musket Wars
Ngāpuhi people
Year of birth missing
People from the Bay of Islands